Shilovsky (masculine), Shilovskaya (feminine), or Shilovskoye (neuter) is the name of several rural localities in Russia:
Shilovsky, Altai Krai, a crossing loop in Shilovsky Selsoviet of Kalmansky District of Altai Krai
Shilovsky, Livensky District, Oryol Oblast, a settlement in Rechitsky Selsoviet of Livensky District of Oryol Oblast
Shilovsky, Orlovsky District, Oryol Oblast, a settlement in Loshakovsky Selsoviet of Orlovsky District of Oryol Oblast
Shilovskoye, Vladimir Oblast, a village in Kovrovsky District of Vladimir Oblast
Shilovskoye, Yaroslavl Oblast, a village in Nikolsky Rural Okrug of Danilovsky District of Yaroslavl Oblast
Shilovskaya, Plesetsky District, Arkhangelsk Oblast, a village in Yarnemsky Selsoviet of Plesetsky District in Arkhangelsk Oblast
Shilovskaya, Shenkursky District, Arkhangelsk Oblast, a village in Ust-Padengsky Selsoviet of Shenkursky District of Arkhangelsk Oblast
Shilovskaya, Velsky District, Arkhangelsk Oblast, a village in Ust-Velsky Selsoviet of Velsky District of Arkhangelsk Oblast
Shilovskaya, Ivanovo Oblast, a village in Pestyakovsky District of Ivanovo Oblast